Asteria is a vocal ensemble founded in 2003 that specializes in historically-informed performances of medieval and Renaissance music, based on extensive research with original source material. It is based in Brooklyn, New York. The act consists of Sylvia Rhyne, soprano, and Eric Redlinger, tenor and lute player. Their repertoire is anchored in 15th century chanson, including noted composers such as Du Fay and Antoine Busnoys.

Winners of the 2004 Unicorn Prize for best North American early music ensemble specializing in medieval and renaissance music, they have since toured extensively in Europe and the Americas.  They have recorded 3 CDs of polyphonic chansons for the Magnatune label.

Asteria is a member of GEMS, a 501(c)(3) organization dedicated to the promotion and advancement of early music in New York City.

Discography
Le souvenir de vous me tue (2004) UPC: 643157337928
Soyes loyal (2006) UPC: 643157378396
Un tres doulx regard (2009) UPC: 859701552819
For the love of Jacqueline (2012) UPC: 859701552819

References

External links
 asteriamusica.com | Sylvia Rhyne & Eric Redlinger
 WGBH Radio interviews Magnatune artist Asteria
 HOME PAGE
 Dial "M" for Musicology: Asteria in Boulder
 San Diego Arts, Entertainment, Restaurants, Travel, Events, Hotels

Early music groups
Musical groups established in 2003